Computer Music is a monthly magazine published by Future plc in the UK. It covers the topic of creating digital music on a computer. Each issue includes a DVD-ROM with samples, plug-ins, software demos, tutorials, and other content related to the issue. Additional content is offered via a download website.

References

External links
 

1998 establishments in the United Kingdom
Computer magazines published in the United Kingdom
Magazines established in 1998
Monthly magazines published in the United Kingdom
Music magazines published in the United Kingdom